Bill Carr (born  1965) is an American basketball coach who is currently the head women's basketball coach at Santa Clara University. He was previously the head men's basketball coach at Point Loma Nazarene University, and also had head coaching stints at Spring Hill College and the University of California, San Diego. Prior to Santa Clara, Carr had spent the entirety of his career coaching men's basketball.

Head coaching record

Men's

Women's

References

External links 
 
 Santa Clara Broncos profile

1965 births
Living people
Sportspeople from Glendale, California
Basketball players from California
Basketball coaches from California
Glendale Vaqueros men's basketball players
San Francisco Dons men's basketball players
San Francisco Dons men's basketball coaches
Spring Hill Badgers men's basketball coaches
Long Beach State Beach men's basketball coaches
UC San Diego Tritons men's basketball coaches
San Diego Toreros men's basketball coaches
Point Loma Nazarene Sea Lions men's basketball coaches
Santa Clara Broncos women's basketball coaches